The Little Willies is an American alternative country supergroup formed in 2003. It features Norah Jones on piano keyboards and vocals, Richard Julian on guitar keyboards and vocals, Jim Campilongo on guitar, Lee Alexander on bass, and Dan Rieser on drums.

The group formed around a love of country classics.  Between members' regular gigs, they first played at New York City's Living Room. The show led to a series of events, including a benefit concert for public radio station WFUV. The "loose-knit collective" found itself with a growing following. The Little Willies’ self-titled debut album has added to their popularity.

Their first album features covers of tracks by Fred Rose ("Roly Poly"), Hank Williams ("I'll Never Get Out of This World Alive"), Willie Nelson ("Gotta Get Drunk" and "Nightlife"), Townes Van Zandt ("No Place to Fall") and Kris Kristofferson ("Best of All Possible Worlds"). Fusing cover material with a few of their own original compositions, the band delivers what a review by John Metzger describes as "an affable set that occasionally strikes pure gold."

Their second album was released in January, 2012 and "features covers from a variety of down-home legends, including Johnny Cash, Kris Kristofferson, Dolly Parton, Loretta Lynn, and many more."

Discography

Albums

Notes

External links

Review of the band's self-titled album
Review of The Little Willies

Musical groups established in 2003
American alternative country groups
Supergroups (music)
Norah Jones